Akira Shoji (小路晃) (born January 31, 1974) is a retired Japanese mixed martial artist and professional wrestler. He is most known as being a regular in almost all the beginning Pride Fighting Championship Shoji was in Pride 1 to Pride 7, and was part of the first Pride open weight Grand Prix in 2000. Shoji was consistently a regular in Pride, and moved from Heavyweight to Light Heavyweight (Middleweight in Pride) due to his smaller stature.

Despite his losing record, Shoji was a constant favourite of the audience, and was nicknamed "Mr. Pride" for his popularity and adherence to the mixed martial arts promotion. He was known for his mic performance, die hard spirit, stellar submission escapes, razor sharp armbar and a fighting spirit demonstrated by his willingness to take on all comers. According to fight commentator Stephen Quadros and John Hyams, director of the documentary "The Smashing Machine", Shoji cleaned his house and prepared his will before every competition in case he is killed during the fight.

He also worked as a judge for the Dream organization.

Mixed martial arts career
A national-ranked judoka since highschool, Shoji firstly dreamed with being a professional wrestler, but he developed an interest in mixed martial arts due to his schoolmate Kazunari Murakami, who convinced him to try on the Wajyutsu Keishukai gym. After graduating from Chukyo University, Shoji joined the dojo full-time and became a professional fighter. He represented WK at the Lumax Cup tournament, but he was eliminated at the first round.

Pride
Shoji had his worldwide debut taking on Renzo Gracie from the Gracie family at the first event of Pride in 1997. Though clearly outclassed, Shoji held his own and escaped from numerous submission attempts through the match, including an armbar and an omoplata which were almost fully locked, while regularly landing low kicks and some knees to the head. After thirty minutes, the match was ruled a draw due to the absence of judges. Nonetheless, Shoji got acclaimed by the crowd for his performance, which included grabbing the mic after the match and yelling "What do you say now, Gracies? Who said the Japanese were the weakest?" (Nani ga Gracie jā! Nani ga Nippon sai jaku jā?)

He returned at the next two events of Pride, submitting Juan Mott via rear naked choke and drawing with Takada Dojo understudy and fellow underdog Daijiro Matsui. However, his biggest victory came at Pride 4, where Shoji faced another unbeaten Brazilian jiu-jitsu exponent, Wallid Ismail. The Brazilian was aggressive and held Akira mounted for the first round, with Shoji reversing him every time. At the second round, however, the Japanese got the upper hand over a tired Ismail and landed multiple answered punches, which prompted the referee to stop the match for a win for Shoji.

Akira next faced Ukrainian Igor Vovchanchyn, who would become one of Pride's top strikers. Knowing the strengths of his adversary, Shoji played conservatively and avoided the KO for a decision loss. Shortly after, Shoji bounced back with another shocking victory in a match against Ultimate Fighting Championship champion and former King of Pancrase Guy Mezger. The fight was slow and strategic, with long battles on the clinch, with Mezger landing several strikes, but Shoji eventually found opportunities to take Mezger down and perform ground and pound. The judges gave the split decision to the Japanese, which was met with controversy in the United States.

At the Pride Grand Prix 2000 tournament, Shoji was first pitted against luta livre practitioner Ebenezer Fontes Braga, getting a unanimous decision victory. He advanced round, but he was then eliminated by the eventual winner Mark Coleman.

Shoji's last match in Pride would be in its very last event in 2007, fighting Gilbert Yvel and losing by TKO after a brief grappling exchange.

Retirement
While working as a fighting referee in Dream, Shoji considered a final retirement match. He got his will at DEEP 53 in a match against Kazuo Misaki, which he lost by TKO in the second round. Both Misaki and Shoji broke out in tears after the fight, overwhelmed by emotions, knowing it was Shoji's final match.

Professional wrestling career

Hustle (2008-2009)
In 2008, Shoji began working in professional wrestling company Hustle, hosted by Dream Stage Entertainment along with Pride, and became a regular roster of the promotion. He debuted as a participant the Hustle Grand Prix tournament, being invited by famous idol Yuko Ogura and granted the ring name of "Ko♥Ri♥Ta♥N", but he was defeated by Osaka Pro Wrestling representative Zeus after getting hit with a frying pan.

Shoji then joined Generalissimo Takada's villainous faction Takada Monster Army, invited by Yuji Shimada, and he changed his name to "Private Shimada". In 2009, after losing a match to Wataru Sakata and Kurodaman, he was put on a trial by Shimada and threatened with expulsion if he lost a next singles match against Sakata, which eventually became a 3-way match with fellow Monster Army member Commander An Jo. Shoji have his best, but Shimada and An Jo crashed the match and made him lose. Kicked out of Takada's faction, Akira joined Sakata and got his revenge over Anjo, defeating him and Rey Ohara in a tag team match. remained as his ally until the end of the promotion.

Smash (2010-2011)
After Hustle's closure, Shoji joined Smash, a new promotion founded by Yoshihiro Tajiri and several former officials and wrestlers of Hustle. On January 30, 2011, Shoji lost to Yusuke Kodama in his final match before retiring from professional wrestling.

Mixed martial arts record 

| Loss
| align=center| 14–17–5
| Kazuo Misaki
| TKO (punches)
| DEEP: 53 Impact
| 
| align=center| 2
| align=center| 1:13
| Tokyo, Japan
| 
|-
| Loss
| align=center| 14–16–5
| Gilbert Yvel
| TKO (punches)
| PRIDE 34
| 
| align=center| 1
| align=center| 3:04
| Saitama, Japan
| 
|-
| Win
| align=center| 14–15–5
| Carlos Toyota
| Decision (majority)
| DEEP: clubDEEP Toyama: Barbarian Festival 5
| 
| align=center| 2
| align=center| 5:00
| Toyama, Japan
| 
|-
| Loss
| align=center| 13–15–5
| Kyacey Uscola
| KO (punches)
| KOTC: All Stars
| 
| align=center| 2
| align=center| 2:23
| Reno, Nevada, United States
| 
|-
| Win
| align=center| 13–14–5
| Todd Medina
| Decision (unanimous)
| KOTC: Rapid Fire
| 
| align=center| 3
| align=center| 5:00
| San Jacinto, California, United States
| 
|-
| Loss
| align=center| 12–14–5
| Kazuo Misaki
| Technical Submission (guillotine choke)
| DEEP: 23 Impact
| 
| align=center| 1
| align=center| 2:32
| Tokyo, Japan
| 
|-
| Loss
| align=center| 12–13–5
| Mark Weir
| KO (head kick)
| Cage Rage 14
| 
| align=center| 1
| align=center| 0:17
| London, England
| 
|-
| Loss
| align=center| 12–12–5
| Dean Lister
| Technical Submission (triangle choke)
| PRIDE Bushido 6
| 
| align=center| 1
| align=center| 3:13
| Yokohama, Japan
| 
|-
| Loss
| align=center| 12–11–5
| Paulo Filho
| Decision (split)
| PRIDE Bushido 4
| 
| align=center| 2
| align=center| 5:00
| Nagoya, Japan
| 
|-
| Win
| align=center| 12–10–5
| Yukio Kawabe
| TKO (punches)
| PRIDE Bushido 3
| 
| align=center| 1
| align=center| 0:18
| Yokohama, Japan
| 
|-
| Loss
| align=center| 11–10–5
| Murilo Rua
| KO (flying knee)
| PRIDE Shockwave 2003
| 
| align=center| 1
| align=center| 2:24
| Saitama, Japan
| 
|-
| Loss
| align=center| 11–9–5
| Maurício Rua
| KO (punches)
| PRIDE Bushido 1
| 
| align=center| 1
| align=center| 3:47
| Saitama, Japan
| 
|-
| Win
| align=center| 11–8–5
| Dustin Denes
| Decision (unanimous)
| Absolute Fighting Championships 4
| 
| align=center| 3
| align=center| 5:00
| Fort Lauderdale, Florida, United States
| 
|-
| Win
| align=center| 10–8–5
| Alex Stiebling
| Decision (split)
| PRIDE 25
| 
| align=center| 3
| align=center| 5:00
| Yokohama, Japan
| 
|-
| Loss
| align=center| 9–8–5
| Paulo Filho
| Submission (armbar)
| PRIDE 22
| 
| align=center| 1
| align=center| 2:48
| Nagoya, Japan
| 
|-
| Win
| align=center| 9–7–5
| David Roberts
| Submission (armbar)
| KOTC 13: Revolution
| 
| align=center| 2
| align=center| 4:46
| Reno, Nevada, United States
| 
|-
| Loss
| align=center| 8–7–5
| Jeremy Horn
| Decision (unanimous)
| PRIDE 18
| 
| align=center| 3
| align=center| 5:00
| Fukuoka, Japan
| 
|-
| Loss
| align=center| 8–6–5
| Semmy Schilt
| KO (knee and punches)
| PRIDE 16
| 
| align=center| 1
| align=center| 8:19
| Osaka, Japan
| 
|-
| Loss
| align=center| 8–5–5
| Dan Henderson
| TKO (punches and knees)
| PRIDE 14
| 
| align=center| 3
| align=center| 3:18
| Yokohama, Japan
| 
|-
| Loss
| align=center| 8–4–5
| Ricardo Almeida
| Decision (unanimous)
| PRIDE 12
| 
| align=center| 2
| align=center| 5:00
| Saitama, Japan
| 
|-
| Win
| align=center| 8–3–5
| Herman Renting
| Submission (armbar)
| PRIDE 10
| 
| align=center| 1
| align=center| 3:48
| Osaka, Japan
| 
|-
| Win
| align=center| 7–3–5
| John Renken
| Submission (armbar)
| PRIDE 9
| 
| align=center| 1
| align=center| 6:44
| Nagoya, Japan
| 
|-
| Loss
| align=center| 6–3–5
| Mark Coleman
| Decision (unanimous)
| PRIDE Grand Prix 2000 Finals
| 
| align=center| 1
| align=center| 15:00
| Tokyo, Japan
| 
|-
| Win
| align=center| 6–2–5
| Ebenezer Fontes Braga
| Decision (unanimous)
| PRIDE Grand Prix 2000 Opening Round
| 
| align=center| 1
| align=center| 15:00
| Tokyo, Japan
| 
|-
| Draw
| align=center| 5–2–5
| Ryushi Yanagisawa
| Draw
| Pancrase: 1999 Anniversary Show
| 
| align=center| 1
| align=center| 15:00
| Urayasu, Chiba, Japan
| 
|-
| Win
| align=center| 5–2–4
| Larry Parker
| Decision (unanimous)
| PRIDE 7
| 
| align=center| 3
| align=center| 5:00
| Yokohama, Japan
| 
|-
| Win
| align=center| 4–2–4
| Guy Mezger
| Decision (split)
| PRIDE 6
| 
| align=center| 3
| align=center| 5:00
| Yokohama, Japan
| 
|-
| Loss
| align=center| 3–2–4
| Igor Vovchanchyn
| Decision (unanimous)
| PRIDE 5
| 
| align=center| 2
| align=center| 10:00
| Nagoya, Japan
| 
|-
| Win
| align=center| 3–1–4
| Wallid Ismail
| TKO (punches)
| PRIDE 4
| 
| align=center| 2
| align=center| 1:26
| Tokyo, Japan
| 
|-
| Draw
| align=center| 2–1–4
| Adriano de Souza
| Draw
| GCM: Vale Tudo
| 
| align=center| 3
| align=center| 5:00
| Japan
| 
|-
| Draw
| align=center| 2–1–3
| Daijiro Matsui
| Draw
| PRIDE 3
| 
| align=center| 4
| align=center| 10:00
| Tokyo, Japan
| 
|-
| Win
| align=center| 2–1–2
| Juan Mott
| Submission (rear naked choke)
| PRIDE 2
| 
| align=center| 1
| align=center| 3:47
| Yokohama, Japan
| 
|-
| Draw
| align=center| 1–1–2
| Renzo Gracie
| Draw
| PRIDE 1
| 
| align=center| 3
| align=center| 10:00
| Tokyo, Japan
| 
|-
| Loss
| align=center| 1–1–1
| Kaichi Tsuji
| Decision (unanimous)
| Lumax Cup: Tournament of J '97 Heavyweight Tournament
| 
| align=center| 2
| align=center| 3:00
| Japan
| 
|-
| Win
| align=center| 1–0–1
| Vidal Serradilla
| TKO (submission to punches)
| JECVTO: Japan Extreme Challenge Vale Tudo Open
| 
| align=center| 1
| align=center| 2:16
| Tokyo, Japan
| 
|-
| Draw
| align=center| 0–0–1
| Manabu Ohara
| Draw
| KP X WK: Koppo vs. Keisyukai
| 
| align=center| 1
| align=center| 20:00
| Japan
|

Submission grappling record
KO PUNCHES
|- style="text-align:center; background:#f0f0f0;"
| style="border-style:none none solid solid; "|Result
| style="border-style:none none solid solid; "|Opponent
| style="border-style:none none solid solid; "|Method
| style="border-style:none none solid solid; "|Event
| style="border-style:none none solid solid; "|Date
| style="border-style:none none solid solid; "|Round
| style="border-style:none none solid solid; "|Time
| style="border-style:none none solid solid; "|Notes
|-
|Loss|| Fabrício Werdum || Armbar || ADCC 2003 Absolute|| 2003|| 1|| ||
|-
|Win|| Mitsuhiro Ishida || Points || ADCC 2003 Absolute|| 2003|| 1|| ||
|-
|Loss|| David Terrel || Points || ADCC 2003 +88 kg|| 2003|| 1|| ||
|-
|Loss|| Amaury Bitteti || Points || ADCC 1999 –88 kg|| 1999|| 1|| 10:00||
|-
|Win|| Masutatsu Yano || Decision || The CONTENDERS 1|| 1999|| 3|| 5:00||
|-

See also 
 List of male mixed martial artists

References

External links 
 
 
 Pride Official Site

1974 births
Living people
Japanese male mixed martial artists
Middleweight mixed martial artists
Light heavyweight mixed martial artists
Heavyweight mixed martial artists
Mixed martial artists utilizing judo
Mixed martial artists utilizing wrestling
Sportspeople from Toyama Prefecture
People from Uozu, Toyama
Mixed martial arts referees